Hallstahammars SK is a Swedish sports club located in Hallstahammar in Västmanland County.

Background
Since their foundation in 1906 Hallstahammars Sportklubb has participated in the upper and lower divisions of the Swedish football league system.  The club played in Allsvenskan  during the 1931–32 and 1938–39 seasons. Hallstahammars SK currently plays in Division 4 Västmanland which is the sixth tier of Swedish football. They play their home matches at the Trollebo IP in Hallstahammar.

Hallstahammars SK are affiliated to the Västmanlands Fotbollförbund.

The club also has or has had active sections for bandy, handball and ice hockey.

Season to season

In their early history Hallstahammars SK competed in the following divisions:

In recent seasons Hallstahammars SK have competed in the following divisions:

Attendances

In recent seasons Hallstahammars SK have had the following average attendances:

Footnotes

External links
 Hallstahammars SK – Official website 
 Official site – team handball 

Bandy clubs in Sweden
Allsvenskan clubs
Football clubs in Västmanland County
Association football clubs established in 1906
Bandy clubs established in 1906
1906 establishments in Sweden